Köpingsvik is a locality situated in Borgholm Municipality, Kalmar County, Sweden with 599 inhabitants in 2010.

Köpingsvik is known as a tourist center, offering large and modern camping sites. Nearby are the historic sites of Borgholm Castle and Halltorps Estate.

Köping was in operation from the 7th to the 13th century. It was also an important center of early Christianity in Sweden. During the last ten years there have been several small excavations which have confirmed the earlier findings and the importance of the site. Note that these findings are almost unknown to public in Sweden and the ruling view is that the little site on Björkö is Sweden's "oldest town".

Köping faded away around 1200, and Kalmar took over as the most important harbour town in south-eastern Sweden.

Köping is claimed by some amateur historians and historians as a possible alternative to Björkö for the location of the old viking village Birka in SvíÞjóð (the ancient name for Sweden). Birka is mentioned in Vita Ansgari and the work of Adam of Bremen.  He states that Birka is situated directly north of Jomsborg and directly opposite to Kurland and at the same distance between them. This theory has not been widely accepted.

References

External links
Köpingsvik.se - Facts about Köpingsvik, Öland

Populated places in Borgholm Municipality